Frederick Funston Henry (September 23, 1919 – September 1, 1950) was a United States Army officer and a posthumous recipient of the United States military's highest decoration, the Medal of Honor, for his actions during the Second Battle of Naktong Bulge in the Korean War.

Biography 
Henry joined the Army from Clinton, Oklahoma in September 1940, a week before his 21st birthday. By September 1, 1950, he was serving as a first lieutenant in Company F of the 38th Infantry Regiment. On that day, near Andong, Korea, his platoon was attacked by a numerically superior enemy force. Although seriously wounded, Henry ordered his men to withdraw while he stayed behind to cover their retreat. He single-handedly held the attackers at bay until being killed. For these actions, he was posthumously awarded the Medal of Honor five months later, on February 16, 1951.

Henry's official Medal of Honor citation reads:
1st Lt. Henry, Company F, distinguished himself by conspicuous gallantry and intrepidity above and beyond the call of duty in action. His platoon was holding a strategic ridge near the town when they were attacked by a superior enemy force, supported by heavy mortar and artillery fire. Seeing his platoon disorganized by this fanatical assault, he left his foxhole and moving along the line ordered his men to stay in place and keep firing. Encouraged by this heroic action the platoon reformed a defensive line and rained devastating fire on the enemy, checking its advance. Enemy fire had knocked out all communications and 1st Lt. Henry was unable to determine whether or not the main line of resistance was alerted to this heavy attack. On his own initiative, although severely wounded, he decided to hold his position as long as possible and ordered the wounded evacuated and their weapons and ammunition brought to him. Establishing a l-man defensive position, he ordered the platoon's withdrawal and despite his wound and with complete disregard for himself remained behind to cover the movement. When last seen he was single-handedly firing all available weapons so effectively that he caused an estimated 50 enemy casualties. His ammunition was soon expended and his position overrun, but this intrepid action saved the platoon and halted the enemy's advance until the main line of resistance was prepared to throw back the attack. 1st Lt. Henry's outstanding gallantry and noble self-sacrifice above and beyond the call of duty reflect the highest honor on him and are in keeping with the esteemed traditions of the U.S. Army.

Legacy
In May 1960, a U.S. Army facility in Daegu, South Korea, was renamed Camp Henry in his honor. 

On October 20, 2004, a large crowd  came together at the Annabelle Farmer Park in downtown Vian.  They had come together to pay respects to long-lost hometown hero and Medal of Honor recipient, 1st Lt. Frederick F. Henry.

"Nearly 100 people attended the ceremony at Annabelle Farmer Park, according to Vian Mayor Kenneth Johnson. Many were townspeople acting on an opportunity to honor the local man whose heroism in combat was long missing from their city’s history; some were state, military and local officials who felt it their duty to honor the Army lieutenant last seen defending his platoon from a fast-approaching wave of North Korean forces; and more than a dozen ventured into the Sequoyah County city as representatives of a relative taken in war, whose goodness survived through the lives he protected.
Henry’s story is now a landmark. A memorial dedicated to Henry and his service in the Army was unveiled at theceremony, according to former Vian Mayor Robert Morris."

See also

List of Korean War Medal of Honor recipients

References

External links
 
 

1919 births
1950 deaths
People from Sequoyah County, Oklahoma
United States Army officers
American military personnel killed in the Korean War
United States Army Medal of Honor recipients
Korean War recipients of the Medal of Honor
Military personnel from Oklahoma
United States Army personnel of World War II
United States Army personnel of the Korean War